Danube was a  74-gun ship of the line of the French Navy.

Career 
Danube served under Captain Henry in 1810.

Notes, citations, and references

Notes

Citations

References
 

Ships of the line of the French Navy
Téméraire-class ships of the line
1808 ships